HMS Avon was a Royal Navy  built at Falmouth and launched in 1805. In the War of 1812 she fought a desperate action with  that resulted in Avon sinking on 27 August 1814.

Service
Avon entered service at Spithead under the command of Commander Francis J. Snell and sailed for the Mediterranean on 18 April 1805. On 7 May she captured Frisken. By 9 May Avon was off Lisbon, where the schooner  reported to Snell her capture of the Spanish privateer lugger Travella, of three guns and 40 men, off the Bayona Islands (Baiona), and the recapture of the British brig Stork. Then on 20 January 1806, Avon was present when  recaptured Maid of the Mill.

In March 1806 Avon came briefly under the command of Commander James Stewart and was employed in convoying and cruising. In May Commander Mauritius Adolphus Newton De Stark took command and sailed Avon in the Channel. He was then given the task of escorting to the Baltic the Russian vessel Neva, which was returning from a voyage of discovery. Hostilities had just begun between Napoleon and Russia and the British government deemed an escort a prudent precaution. For his services the Tsar presented de Stark with a breakfast service of plate and a purse of 100 guineas.

Avon sailed for North America on 28 August. She was carrying Mr Erskine, HM Minister to the United States. On the way to the United States, Avon encountered the French 74-gun Regulus, which gave chase for eight hours, firing constantly, before de Stark was able to lose her in a squall. Avon arrived at Annapolis Royal on 30 October. On his return voyage he met up with a Royal Navy 74-gun ship with orders to go to Bermuda and then to take to Britain despatches from French Admiral Willaumez that Avon had taken from an American vessel she had examined on her way out of the Chesapeake. Avon arrived at Spithead on 7 January 1807.

In January 1807 Commander Thomas Thrush took command and sailed Avon to Jamaica on 16 April. (He had been appointed to her in September 1806 but had had to await her return.) During her time on the Jamaica station lightning struck Avon, damaging her badly, but fortunately causing no deaths. Thrush also had the opportunity to take Avon to Cartagena to pick up a freight of dollars; his commission on the transport when he delivered it to Britain was £2,056.

In June 1809 Commander Henry Fraser took command. On 15 March 1810, the 28-gun Rainbow, under James Woolbridge, and Avon encountered the French frigate Néréide, under the command of  Jean-François Lemaresquier. Lemaresquier fled to separate the two British ships, but stopped to engage Rainbow after Avon had fallen back. He soon had reduced Rainbow  to a battered state, but Avon resolutely came in support and put a 30-minute fight against the much stronger Néréide before herself retreating. Damage on Néréide prevented her from giving chase. Lemaresquier therefore continued on his course, reaching Brest on 30 March.  By 1812 Avon was back at Portsmouth.

Commander George Sartorious took command on 22 July 1813 and Avon served on the Cork Station. She underwent repairs at Portsmouth in November. Sartorious left her in June 1814 on his promotion to post-captain, and Commander the Honourable James Arbuthnot recommissioned her in July.

Sinking by USS Wasp

On 1 September 1814, and Avon recaptured Atlantic.

That evening Avon encountered the United States Navy ship-rigged sloop of war  in the English Channel. Wasp spotted Avons sail on the horizon and gave chase. By 9:30pm, Wasp had Avon under her lee bow and opened fire. Avon returned fire until 10pm, at which time her guns, according to the crew of Wasp, fell silent. Wasp then ceased fire and called for Avon to surrender, but Avon answered with another cannonade. Wasp returned fire. Some broadsides later, Avons guns fell silent once more and Wasp again called for surrender. Avon, by now a battered hulk, had no choice but to concede.

Just as Wasp began to lower the boat for the prize crew to go aboard Avon, Wasps lookout sighted another British brig sailing toward Wasp and Avon. Wasps crew manned their battle stations immediately in hope of taking the newcomer, the 18-gun Castilian, as well. Just then, two more British ships appeared on the horizon. Wasp therefore sailed away, abandoning Avon.

Although the Americans didn't know it at the time, Avon sank at 1am, soon after Wasp left her. She had lost ten men killed and 29 wounded in the action. Castillian rescued the survivors from Avon.

Notes

Citations

References
 
 
 Colledge, J. J. Ships of the Royal Navy: The Complete Record of All Fighting Ships of the Royal Navy From the Fifteenth Century to the Present. Annapolis, Maryland: Naval Institute Press, 1987. .

External links
 Michael Phillips - Ships of the Old Navy - HMS Avon

 

Cruizer-class brig-sloops
War of 1812 ships of the United Kingdom
1805 ships
Ships built in England
Maritime incidents in 1814